William Davies (10 March 1900 – 1953) was a Welsh professional footballer who made over 300 appearances in the Football League during spells with Swansea Town, Cardiff City, Notts County and Tottenham Hotspur. He also made 17 appearances for Wales, scoring six times.

Early life
Davies was born in Troedyrhiw to Thomas and Mary Davies, growing up in Harriet Town.

Career

Davies began his career playing for local amateur sides, joining Rhymney where he once scored 61 goals in a single season. He was signed by Swansea Town in 1921, playing in every forward position for the club before settling at outside-right. He made his Wales debut while playing for Swansea but, in 1924 with the club going through financial trouble, he moved to Cardiff City for a fee of £25. In his first season at the club, he was part of the side that reached the FA Cup Final, including scoring a goal direct from a corner-kick in the quarter-final victory over Leicester City.

He contracted a serious chest illness soon after and missed more than a year for the club, including missing the teams FA Cup victory in 1927. He briefly returned to the side at the start of the 1927–28 season but was sold to Notts County soon after, where he spent two years before moving on to Tottenham Hotspur. He later returned to Wales to finish his league career at Swansea.

International career

During his career, Davies won a total of 17 caps for Wales, making a goalscoring debut in a 2–0 victory over Scotland on 16 February 1924 in the 1924 British Home Championship. Davies played in the remaining two matches of the championship, scoring his second international goal in a 2–1 victory over England, as Wales won the tournament for the third time. He later also helped Wales win the British Home Championship for a second time in four years in 1928. His last goal for Wales came on 27 October 1928, when he scored twice in a 4–2 defeat to Scotland, before winning his last cap on 1 February 1930 when he played in a 7–0 defeat to Ireland.

Career statistics

International

Wales score listed first, score column indicates score after each Davies goal

Honours
Cardiff City

 FA Cup runner-up: 1924–1925
Wales

 British Home Championship: 1923–1924, 1927–1928

References

1900 births
1953 deaths
Welsh footballers
Wales international footballers
Swansea City A.F.C. players
Cardiff City F.C. players
Notts County F.C. players
Tottenham Hotspur F.C. players
English Football League players
People from Troed-y-rhiw
Sportspeople from Merthyr Tydfil County Borough
Association football forwards
FA Cup Final players